John Carl Cederquist (born August 7, 1946) is an American sculptor in wood and builder of studio furniture who was born in Altadena, California.  He graduated from Long Beach State College with a BA in 1969 and an MA in 1971.

Cederquist is best known for his playful, trompe-l'œil wood assemblages―often in the form of pieces of furniture―that blur the distinctions between reality and illusion.  He often employs cartoon-like drawings and skewed perspectives.  Since 1976, he has taught at Saddleback College in Mission Viejo, California.

References
 Cooke, Edward S., Gerald W.R. Ward and Kelly H. L'Ecuyer, The Maker's Hand, American Studio Furniture, 1940-1990, Boston, Museum of Fine Arts Publications, 2003.
 Danto, Arthur Coleman, The Art of John Cederquist: Reality of Illusion, Oakland, California, Oakland Museum of California, 1997.

External links
 John Cederquist
 John Cederquist's works go on display at Santa Ana College

Modern sculptors
American furniture designers
20th-century American sculptors
Altadena, California
Living people
Saddleback College people
California State University, Long Beach alumni
1946 births
Fellows of the American Craft Council
21st-century American sculptors